Reichenbach Falls is a 2007 British thriller television film directed by John McKay and starring Alec Newman, Alastair Mackenzie and Nina Sosanya. The script was adapted by James Mavor from a short story by Ian Rankin.

Premise
In modern Edinburgh, DI Buchan investigates a hundred-year-old case.

Cast
 Alec Newman ... Jim Buchan
 Alastair Mackenzie ... Jack Harvey
 Nina Sosanya ... Sinead Burns
 Laura Fraser ... Clara
 John Sessions ... Professor Bell
 Richard Wilson ... Arthur Conan Doyle
 The Monkey ... Himself
 Tom McGovern ... Gerry
 Greg Powrie ... Tour Guide
 David Robertson ... Newsreader
 Kirsty Wark ... Herself
 Cora Bisset ... Publicist

See also
Reichenbach Falls

References

External links

British television films
2007 television films
2007 films
BBC television dramas
Films directed by John McKay
Films shot in Edinburgh
Films based on short fiction
2000s English-language films